Qualifications for Women's artistic gymnastic competitions at the 2011 Pan American Games was held at the Nissan Gymnastics Stadium on October 24. The results of the qualification determined the qualifiers to the finals: 24 gymnasts in the all-around final, and 8 gymnasts in each of 4 apparatus finals.

Qualification results

All-Around qualifiers

Only two gymnasts per country may advance to a final. The following gymnasts scored high enough to qualify, but did not do so because two gymnasts from their country had already qualified ahead of them:
  53.150 (7th place)
  52.725 (11th place)
  52.625 (12th place)
  52.625 (13th place)
  52.500 (16th place)
  52.075 (18th place)
  51.650 (20th place)
  51.475(22nd place)
  50.400 (24th place)
  50.175 (26th place)
  50.100 (27th place)
  49.900 (28th place)
  48.900 (33rd place)
  46.600 (37th place)

Individual vault

Individual uneven bars

Individual balance beam

Individual floor

References

Gymnastics at the 2011 Pan American Games
2011 in women's gymnastics